Desmond Gerald Fitzgerald (1834-1905) was an English electrician and spiritualist.

Fitzgerald founded a weekly magazine known as Electrician in 1861. It later became a monthly magazine. Fitzgerald was also involved in improving the manufacture of white lead.

Fitzgerald was a vice-president of the British National Association of Spiritualists and an editor for a spiritualist journal Spiritual Notes. He was a convinced believer in mesmerism and spiritualism. He also defended the discredited "Odic force" of Carl Reichenbach.

He was an early council member of the Society for Psychical Research.

References

1834 births
1905 deaths
English electricians
English spiritualists
Parapsychologists
19th-century British businesspeople